The Mouthpiece of Zitu is a science fiction novel by American writer John Ulrich Giesy.  It was first published in book form in 1965 by Avalon Books.  The novel was originally serialized in five parts in the magazine All-Story Weekly beginning in August 1919.

Plot summary
The second novel in the Jason Croft series finds Jason once again relating his adventures on the world of Palos to Dr.
George Murray via astral projection.  Croft awakens to find that the high priest Zud has declared him the "Mouthpiece of Zitu", complicating matters with his engagement to Naia.  Croft once again relies on using astral projection and his knowledge of earth technology to strengthen the nation of Tamarizia and once more win the heart of the princess.

External links
Page at Internet Speculative Fiction Database
 

1965 American novels
American science fiction novels
Astral projection in popular culture
Novels first published in serial form
Works originally published in Argosy (magazine)
1919 American novels
Avalon Books books